Gebo and the Shadow (Portuguese: O Gebo e a Sombra, French: Gebo et l'Ombre) is a 2012 Portuguese-French drama film directed by Manoel de Oliveira. It is based on a play by Raul Brandão. It was shown at the 69th Venice International Film Festival. The film received a 100% rating on Rotten Tomatoes.

It was the final feature film directed by de Oliveira, who was 104 years of age when the film was released, and one of the last film appearances of Jeanne Moreau before her death on 31 July 2017.

Cast
 Claudia Cardinale as Doroteia  
 Jeanne Moreau as Candidinha  
 Michael Lonsdale as Gebo  
 Leonor Silveira as Sofia  
 Ricardo Trêpa as João 
 Luís Miguel Cintra as Chamiço

References

External links
 

2012 drama films
Films directed by Manoel de Oliveira
2010s French-language films
2012 films
Portuguese drama films
French drama films
Films shot in Paris
French films based on plays
2010s French films